Åke Larsson (born 7 September 1931) is a Swedish former footballer who played as a defender.

References

Association football defenders
Swedish footballers
Allsvenskan players
Malmö FF players
1931 births
Living people